In statistics, the Robbins lemma, named after Herbert Robbins, states that if X is a random variable having a Poisson distribution with parameter λ, and f is any function for which the expected value E(f(X)) exists, then
 

Robbins introduced this proposition while developing empirical Bayes methods.

References

Theorems in statistics
Lemmas
Poisson distribution